The 2010 AFC Cup was the 7th edition of the competition, played between clubs from nations who are members of the Asian Football Confederation. The Knockout stage of the competition was held following the completion of the Qualifying competition.

Bracket
Note: while the bracket below shows the entire knockout stage, the draw for the round of 16 matches was determined at the time of the group draw.

The draw for the quarter-finals and beyond was held separately, after the conclusion of the round of 16. Because of the country protection rule, if there are two clubs from the same country, they will not face each other in the quarter-finals. Therefore, the two clubs from Syria, Kuwait, and Thailand may not be drawn with each other in the quarter-finals.

Round of 16

Quarter-finals

First leg

Second leg

Al-Riffa won 8–3 on aggregate.

Muangthong United won 2–1 on aggregate.

Al-Qadsia won 3–0 on aggregate.

Al-Ittihad won 4–2 on aggregate.

Semi-finals

First leg

Second leg

Al-Qadsia won 4–3 on aggregate.

Al-Ittihad won 2–1 on aggregate.

Final

References

Goalzz.com

Knockout stage